D70 may refer to:
 , a 1911 Royal Australian Navy River class destroyer
 , a 1944 British Royal Navy Battle-class destroyer
 , a 1942 British Royal Navy Attacker-class escort carrier
 Nikon D70, a 2004 digital single-lens reflex camera model
 D70 road (Croatia), a state road
 Agranulocytosis, an acute condition involving a severe leukopenia (ICD-10 code: D70)
 Neo-Grünfeld Defence, Encyclopaedia of Chess Openings code

See also
 70D (disambiguation)
 70 (disambiguation)